Madagascar's network of about 4,500 roads spans approximately  and is focused on facilitating transportation to and from Antananarivo. Transportation on these roads, most of which are unpaved and two lanes wide, is often dangerous.

While most primary roads are in good condition, the World Food Program has classified two-thirds of the roads as being in poor condition. Many roads are impassable during Madagascar's wet season; some bridges (often narrow, one-lane structures) are vulnerable to being swept away. Few rural Malagasy live near a road in good condition; poor road connectivity may pose challenges in health care, agriculture, and education.

Drivers in Madagascar travel on the right side of the road. Partial reporting of car collision fatalities and a World Health Organization approximation of a full number suggest that the rate of car collision fatalities is among the highest in the world. Random police checkpoints, at which travelers are required to produce identity documents, are spread throughout the country.

Crops are transported by ox cart locally and by truck inter-regionally. , rides on  cost as little as 200 Malagasy ariary (roughly US$0.10), and vehicles involved are often overpacked with people, sometimes with the assistant driver riding on the outside of the vehicle. Stops on their routes are generally not fixed, allowing passengers to exit at arbitrary points.

Roads 

There were no roads in Madagascar as of the middle of the 19th century. By 1902, a road had been completed from Mahatsara to Antananarivo.

As of 2022, Madagascar contains over 4,500 unique roads. This is a small road network, mostly oriented toward Antananarivo. Last-mile transport, particularly in rural areas, is sometimes accomplished via unofficial roads. Traffic drives on the right side of the road. 

Most roads of all three types have two lanes and are relatively narrow; many bridges have only one lane. The country's first toll highway, a  road designed to cut the travel time between Antananarivo to Toamasina from the current 10 hours down to a target of 2.5 hours, is under construction .

Road conditions 
The World Food Programme and the Global Logistics Cluster have classified 64 percent of roads in Madagascar as in poor driving condition, 28 percent in average condition, and 10 percent in good condition; seven-in-ten of the primary roads fall into the latter-most category, which is defined as being navigable throughout all seasons of the year. The Statesman's Yearbook 2023 states that only about 22 percent of roads in Madagascar were paved as of 2013, while a 2019 World Bank report states that 81 percent were not paved.  As natural gravel is not regularly available on the island of Madagascar, many roads are composed of sand lined with crushed stone. Many of these unsealed roads can only be used in the dry season. Roads in rural areas are often deficient in signage, while bridges are often swept away following rainstorms; during the wet season, road conditions degrade, particularly so in the country's North.

Connectivity challenges 
, only 11.4 percent of rural Malagasy live within  of a road in good condition, leaving 17 million without such access. Unsealed roads are the only way to access many parts of the country by road, including the key southern city of Fort-Dauphin. A 2018 World Bank report, conducted in partnership with the government of Madagascar, concluded that poor road connectivity was one of the major contributors for poor access to health care. The World Bank further linked poor connectivity to challenges in agriculture and education and identified climate change as having the potential to worsen the road connectivity situation.

Means of transport 

Prior to the construction of the road from Mahatsara to Antanarivo, transportation across the inland highlands was accomplished by porters of the Hova caste (Merina Kingdom–era non-enslaved commoners). After the road was built in 1902, transportation continued to rely on the Hova for a time, for want of oxen or mules to pull the carriages.

Vehicle ownership in Madagascar has grown from under 30,000 to over 800,000 passenger and commercial vehicles since 1955, during which time the island country's population has risen from about 5 million to over 28 million. In reports in 2018 and 2019, the World Bank predicted an increase in car ownership as Madagascar's economy improved. A 2022 World Bank paper published in Public Transport found that 6 percent of Antananarivo households surveyed owned private cars, that private car ownership correlated with high income, and that car owners were less likely to use minibuses.

Taxi brousses 

Madagascar's  ('bush taxis') are a type of share taxi which, cost US$0.10 per passenger. They comprise a public transportation system that is relatively affordable in Madagascar's poverty. Most  do not embark until all seats are full, although this is not universally true. While  use fixed stops, passengers can also exit at any point along the route. National lines travel from their origin to their destination directly, disallowing improvised stops along the route.  company fleets range in size from a single vehicle to over a hundred, and may serve one or more urban, regional, or national lines. A vehicle is staffed by a driver and assistant driver, or two drivers on a very long route. Other people are employed to attract customers and fasten luggage to the vehicle's roof.

According to a 2018 study in Media in Action, most used on paved roads are minibuses, while most on unpaved roads are trucks with benches in the cargo area. They often are filled above capacity, sometimes close to double, with small children riding for free on their parents' laps. The researchers recount that the tight space can lead to conflict among passengers and requires people exiting to either jump out of a window or have everyone in front of them get out too. The assistant driver, who interacts with passengers and loads and unloads luggage, does not get a seat and either stands against the door or travels on the outside of the vehicle. Researchers observed that the drivers often appear to eat for free, as part of arrangements between the  companies and restaurants they stop at. ,  companies must register with the government and pay  in fees and taxes per vehicle. Importation of vehicles is taxed at about ten times this amount.

Cargo transport 

Trans-regional transport of crops relies on trucks. In Vakinankaratra, a network of subcollectors buy crops from farmers in their villages and then sell the crops to wholesale collectors, who either have their own trucks or work with truckers they know. Because of the cost of operating a truck, most truckers own more than one truck so as to take advantage of economies of scale. , most trucking in Vakinankaratra is conducted by ethnic Asians, who tend to be relatively well-off but, due to a history of ethnic tensions, are wary of assets that could easily be seized.

Facing a water crisis in Southern Madagascar, in 1993 the national agency  (AES) engaged with the government of Japan to acquire 24 tanker trucks for water. As of 2004, 10 remain officially in service, although researcher Richard R. Marcus was only able to verify the existence of 6. According to Marcus, AES blamed tire issues, while locals alleged corruption.

Safety 

, there is no national speed limit in rural areas or on highways, though local governments have the ability to impose and modify speed limits within their jurisdictions. The blood alcohol content limit for drunk driving is 0.08 grams per deciliter. There is a seatbelt law but no child restraint law. Motorcyclists must wear helmets. Children are allowed as motorcycle passengers; children under five may not sit in the front seat of a car. Handheld phone use while driving is illegal. A 2018 World Health Organization (WHO) fact sheet said that hands-free use of a phone behind the wheel is legal, though a 2019 information sheet from the United States Bureau of Consular Affairs reported that hands-free use is illegal. Nighttime street lighting in the country is of limited availability. 

The Intersectoral Committee for Road Safety and Ministry of Transport and Meteorology oversee road safety in Madagascar. While there are no official statistics on road safety in Madagascar, the country's Gendarmerie Nationale reported 340 people in 2016 who died within 24 hours of a car crash; the WHO estimated a true total of 7,108 car crash fatalities, or 28.6 per 100,000 inhabitants. In comparison, the global average is 18.2 and the African average is 26.6; Madagascar has the 24th-highest fatality rate out of 175 countries or regions assessed. About half of vehicle fatalities are pedestrians. According to the government of Canada, car collisions in Madagascar may instigate crowd violence. Car collisions in which a participant is injured or killed necessitate a court case, where the parties found liable for damages are required to cover all expenses related to the case; leaving Madagascar is prohibited prior to the completion of the case.

 (bandits) have attacked vehicles, leading the government to require that vehicles travel in convoys of at least 10 on many roads. Vehicles seek to travel at higher speeds, but become more vulnerable to attacks when forced by potholes to slow. Herds of zebu may also pose a hazard to driving. It is customary in Madagascar to blow one's car horn while traveling around road curves in order to notify other drivers of one's presence. Random vehicle checkpoints at which travelers are required to produce identity documents are spread throughout Madagascar.

See also 
 Muddling Through in Madagascar, a 1985 book by Irish author Dervla Murphy which details public transport and road conditions in Madagascar as they existed in the mid-1980s.
 Transport in Madagascar

Notes 
Madagascar French terms

References 

Madagascar
Road transport in Madagascar